Timothy Brian Foley (1 January 1933 – 18 August 1998) is a former Australian rules footballer who played with West Perth in the West Australian National Football League (WANFL). He occupies a forward pocket in West Perth's official 'Team of the Century'.

Foley was a ruckman, nicknamed Big Blue due to his red hair, and when he retired after the 1965 season had played 202 games for West Perth. Career highlights include winning the 1959 Sandover Medal, two best and fairests and a Simpson Medal when he was best on ground in West Perth's 1960 premiership side. From 1960 to 1964 he was club captain and he represented the West Australian interstate team 21 times during his career.

His son Dan played in the Victorian Football League (VFL) with  during the 1980s and his brother Des played for West Perth and East Perth.

References

External links

1933 births
1998 deaths
Australian rules footballers from Western Australia
Sandover Medal winners
West Australian Football Hall of Fame inductees
West Perth Football Club players